Dame Grace Mary Thyrza Kimmins,  (née Hannam; 6 May 1870 – 3 March 1954) was a British writer who created charities that worked with children who had disabilities.

Biography
Kimmins was born in Lewes, Sussex, the eldest of four children born to cloth merchant James Hannam, cloth merchant, and Thyrza Rogers. She was educated at Wilton House School in Bexhill.

Juliana Horatia Ewing's 1885 novel The Story of a Short Life inspired Kimmins to start the Guild of the Poor Brave Things to help children with disabilities in London. Grace (and later Ada Vachell took their motto Laetus sorte mea ("Happy in my lot") from Ewing's book. Kimmins was described in Punch as "... in her quiet practical way is probably as good a friend as London ever had".

She became a Wesleyan deaconess and worked in both the Methodist West London Mission and the Bermondsey Settlement, where she moved in 1895. In 1897, she married Charles William Kimmins. She was active in the foundation and continuance of charitable foundations, particularly those concerned with children's play and the welfare of poor and disabled children.

She founded, caused to be founded or was involved in the Methodist West London Mission, Bermondsey Settlement, Chailey Heritage, Guild of Play, and Guild of the Poor Brave Things. She was also a writer; her only published novel, Polly of Parker's Rents (1899) explored children living in poverty.

Honours
She was named CBE in 1927 and promoted to Dame Commander of the Order of the British Empire (DBE) in 1950.

Family
Grace and Charles Kimmins had two sons:
Lieutenant-General Sir Brian Charles Hannam Kimmins (30 July 1899 – 15 November 1979), British military commander who served as the General Officer Commanding Northern Ireland District.
Anthony Martin Kimmins (10 November 1901 – 19 May 1964), British actor, director and producer.

Death
Dame Grace Kimmins died in Haywards Heath Hospital on 3 March 1954, aged 83.

Bibliography

Notes

References

External links

"Botches" (Scroll down to find "Botches")
Chailey 1914–1918
Chailey Heritage Hospital 
Chailey Heritage School Remembers Queen Mother
Heritage Craft School in Chailey

1870 births
1954 deaths
British activists
British women activists
British feminists
British philanthropists
British Methodists
Dames Commander of the Order of the British Empire
People from Lewes